Susan Egoavil (born ) is a Peruvian female volleyball player, playing as a libero. She is part of the Peru women's national volleyball team.

She participated in the 2015 FIVB Volleyball World Grand Prix.
On club level she played for Sporting Cristal in 2014.

References

External links
 Profile at FIVB.org

1988 births
Living people
Peruvian women's volleyball players
Place of birth missing (living people)
Volleyball players at the 2015 Pan American Games
Pan American Games competitors for Peru
21st-century Peruvian women